Claremontiella consanguinea is a species of sea snail, a marine gastropod mollusk in the family Muricidae, the murex snails or rock snails.

Description

Distribution
This species occurs in the Atlantic Ocean off St. Helena.

References

 Houart, R.: Zuccon, D. & Puillandre, N. (2019). Description of new genera and new species of Ergalataxinae (Gastropoda: Muricidae). Novapex. 20 (Hors série 12): 1-52.

External links
 Smith, E. A. (1890). Report on the marine molluscan fauna of the island of St. Helena. Proceedings of the Zoological Society of London. (1890): 247-317, pls 21-24

consanguinea
Gastropods described in 1890